John Herbert Church (May 24, 1915 – January 5, 1996) was a Canadian ice hockey defenceman who played 130 games in the National Hockey League for the Toronto Maple Leafs, Boston Bruins, and Brooklyn Americans between 1938 and 1946. He was born in Kamsack, Saskatchewan.

Church scored two goals in his lone season with the Boston Bruins.  Curiously, both came against his former team, the Toronto Maple Leafs.

Career statistics

Regular season and playoffs

External links

Obituary at LostHockey.com

1915 births
1996 deaths
Boston Bruins players
Brooklyn Americans players
Canadian ice hockey defencemen
Ice hockey people from Saskatchewan
New Haven Ramblers players
Ontario Hockey Association Senior A League (1890–1979) players
People from Kamsack, Saskatchewan
Providence Reds players
Syracuse Stars (AHL) players
Toronto Maple Leafs players